The Salmson Cricri ("Cricket") was a French light aircraft of the 1930s.

Design and development
The Cricri was a conventional, parasol-wing monoplane with fixed tailskid undercarriage and seating in tandem open cockpits for the pilot and passenger. 

Although originally intended for recreational flying, the type achieved its greatest success when it was selected by the French government to equip the Aviation Populaire, resulting in sales of over 300 machines. This plane was also used as a trainer and patrol aircraft in the French Air Force.

Following the war, CFA attempted to revive the design as the Cricri Major. This differed from its predecessor mainly in having a more powerful engine and an enclosed cabin. Eventually, only ten examples were built.

Variants
D6 Cricri(329 built)
D63 Cricridedicated flight trainer version (2 built)
CFA D.7 Cricri MajorAn enlarged CriCri with enclosed cabin, powered by a 90 hp (67 kW) Salmson 5Aq-01 5-cylinder radial.

Specifications (D6)

References

Bibliography

 
 

1930s French sport aircraft
Salmson aircraft
Single-engined tractor aircraft
Parasol-wing aircraft
Aircraft first flown in 1936